Hajar Saʽid is a small village in Hamdan District of Sanaa Governorate, Yemen. It is located by the road from Sanaa to Shibam Kawkaban.

History 
Hajar Saʽid is first mentioned in the Ghayat al-amani of Yahya ibn al-Husayn, in connection with the events 904 AH (1499 CE). At that time, it marked the westernmost extent of the territory of the Isma'ilis of the Hamdan tribe.

References 

Villages in Sanaa Governorate